The Araponga Municipal Nature Park is a municipal nature park in the state of Rio de Janeiro, Brazil.

Location

The Araponga Municipal Nature Park is in the municipality of São José do Vale do Rio Preto, Rio de Janeiro.
The park protects an area of Atlantic Forest.
It is one of the conservation units that protect the sources of the Piabanha River.

History

The Araponga Municipal Nature Park was created by municipal decree 1.653 of 5 June 2006.
It is administered by the Municipal Department of the Environment of São José do Vale do Rio Preto.
The park was included in the Central Rio de Janeiro Atlantic Forest Mosaic, created in December 2006.
As of 2010 there were no planning documents and no consultative council.

Notes

Sources

Municipal nature parks of Brazil
Protected areas of Rio de Janeiro (state)
2006 establishments in Brazil